Shing Mun Valley is a valley in the Shing Mun area of Hong Kong.

History
Before the construction of Shing Mun Reservoir, there were several villages near the valley. Some of these villages were later relocated near the Tsuen Wan entrance of Shing Mun Tunnels.

Shing Mun San Tsuen in Kam Tin, Yuen Long District, was built by the government and completed in 1930, to accommodate some of the families moved away from the Shing Mun Valley in the late 1920s for the construction of the Shing Mun Reservoir.

See also
 Shing Mun Valley Sports Ground
 Lei Muk Shue
 Wo Yi Hop

References

 
Kwai Tsing District
Tsuen Wan District